Tsoukka is a village in the municipal unit of Makrakomi in Phthiotis, Greece. Its population in 2011 was 402. It is situated at about 600 m elevation. It is 5 km northwest of Makrakomi.

See also

List of settlements in Phthiotis

External links
Tsoukka at the GTP Travel Pages

References

Populated places in Phthiotis